The 330s decade ran from January 1, 330, to December 31, 339.

Significant people
 Constantine I
 Constantine II
 Constantius II
 Constans

References